Baja California Sur is a state in Northwest Mexico divided into five municipalities. According to the 2020 Mexican Census, Baja California Sur is the second least populous state with  inhabitants and the 11th largest by land area, spanning .

Municipalities in Baja California Sur are administratively autonomous of the state according to the 115th article of the 1917 Constitution of Mexico. Every three years, citizens elect a municipal president (Spanish: presidente municipal) by a plurality voting system who heads a concurrently elected municipal council (ayuntamiento) responsible for providing all the public services for their constituents. The municipal council consists of a variable number of trustees and councillors (regidores y síndicos). Municipalities are responsible for public services (such as water and sewerage), street lighting, public safety, traffic, and the maintenance of public parks, gardens and cemeteries. They may also assist the state and federal governments in education, emergency fire and medical services, environmental protection and maintenance of monuments and historical landmarks. Since 1984, they have had the power to collect property taxes and user fees, although more funds are obtained from the state and federal governments than from their own income.

The largest municipality by population in Baja California Sur is Los Cabos, with 351,111 residents, and the smallest is Loreto with 18,052 residents.

Municipalities

References

 
Baja California Sur